Priscilla Misihairabwi-Mushonga is a Zimbabwean politician and Ambassador to the Kingdom of Sweden. During her time as Glen Norah's MP, she also served as the shadow foreign minister for the Movement for Democratic Change. When the party split in 2005, she remained with the MDC formation and was elected Deputy Secretary-General of that party. She has been representing her party in the Zimbabwean political negotiations.

Political career
In 2009 she was appointed Minister of Regional Integration and International Cooperation. In the government of national unity in the 2011 MDC congress she was elected the party's Secretary General, a position she will hold until the next congress in 2016. She is the MDC chief representative at JOMIC (Joint Monitoring and Implementation Committee) and COPAC, the Constitutional Parliamentary Committee, a committee in charge of writing the Zimbabwean constitution.

Personal life
She was widowed after her husband, Dr Christopher Mushonga, died from injuries inflicted on him during a botched robbery.

References

Year of birth missing (living people)
Living people
Government ministers of Zimbabwe
Members of the National Assembly of Zimbabwe
Women government ministers of Zimbabwe
21st-century Zimbabwean politicians
21st-century Zimbabwean women politicians